General (Ret.) Maraden Saur Halomoan Panggabean (June 29, 1922 – May 28, 2000) or more commonly known as Maraden Panggabean was a prominent Indonesian general during the early years of General Suharto's New Order regime.

Early life
Panggabean was born in Tarutung, North Sumatra, on 29 June 1922. He is from the Batak ethnic group.

After completing his education, Panggabean took on work as a teacher, an occupation held in high regard in the Batak community, and even became the principal of a school in Tarutung. In 1942, with the arrival and subsequent occupation of Indonesia by the Japanese Imperial Army, Panggabean left the field of education. He first trained to become a civil servant under the Japanese Occupational Government although he would soon be interested in taking on a military career.

Military career
In 1943, the Japanese Occupation Government formed the Defenders of the Fatherland Army an auxiliary force consisting of Indonesians which were designed to assist the Japanese should the Allies come to invade Indonesia. Like many of his military contemporaries, Panggabean joined. In Panggabean's case however, he seemed to have only manage to go through military schooling and basic training before the Japanese surrendered and nationalist leaders Sukarno and Mohammad Hatta proclaimed Indonesia's independence.

Like all other youths all around Indonesia, Panggabean was caught up in the rush to take weapons from the Japanese in preparation of the formation of a National Army. On 5 October 1945, the People's Security Army, the precursor to the Indonesian National Armed Forces and later on, TNI was formed. Panggabean took up the position of military trainer at Sibolga before serving as Chief of Staff for the 1st Battalion, 4th Regiment, 10th Division in Sumatra until 1949.

Following the Indonesian National Revolution of 1945–1950, Panggabean spent the next 10 years as a regimental chief of staff at Tapanuli and as a sectoral commander in the Military Territory of North Sumatra. In 1957, Panggabean also took the opportunity for further military education at the Infantry Officers Advanced Course in the United States. In 1959, Panggabean became battalion commander before being transferred to Military Territory II/Sriwijaya as resort commander.

Panggabean then received his first assignment out of Sumatra as a military court judge in Makassar, Sulawesi. As the Indonesia-Malaysia confrontation intensified, Panggabean was appointed commander of the 2nd War Theater, with authority over the troops in Borneo. There, he developed a friendship with Suharto  as the then Kostrad commander had troops stationed in Borneo.

After he cracked down on the 30 September Movement, Suharto became the Commander of the Army. Suharto seemed to have remembered Panggabean and appointed him as a staff member with the position of second deputy.

Supersemar controversy
Although originally not part of the events which led to the formulation of Supersemar and Suharto receiving executive power, Panggabean became part of the controversy in 1998. According to Sukardjo Wilardjito, a presidential bodyguard stationed at Bogor, Panggabean was present with Amirmachmud, M Jusuf, and Basuki Rahmat, the three generals that many accounts agree to have been present when Supersemar was signed. According to Sukardjo, Panggabean, alongside Basuki held Sukarno at gunpoint while he signed a pre-prepared Supersemar.

New Order

Military career during New Order
In July 1966, the position of Deputy Army Commander was created and Panggabean was appointed to the position to assist Suharto with his increasing workload. In 1967, Panggabean became Army Commander himself. As Army Commander, Panggabean witnessed a reorganization in the Indonesian National Armed Forces which saw the armed services commanders be reduced in status to chief of staffs under the control of an Army commander, a position to be filled by Suharto himself. In 1969, Panggabean became the Commander of Kopkamtib. Two years later, in 1971, Suharto reshuffled the Cabinet and Panggabean became Deputy Commander in addition to becoming State Minister assisting the President in matters of Defense and Security.

Panggabean reached the pinnacle of his military career in 1973 when he became Commander of the Indonesian National Armed Forces in addition to becoming Minister of Defense and Security. As Commander, Panggabean had differences with Minister of Foreign Affairs Adam Malik in the way in which Indonesia should approach its foreign policy in South East Asia. Malik wanted ASEAN to only be about economic cooperation whilst Panggabean wanted ASEAN to also be about security cooperation. In addition, Panggabean also wanted to send troops to assist the South Vietnamese in the Vietnam War. On this matter, Suharto sided with Malik.

In April 1978, Panggabean was discharged as Commander of the Indonesian National Armed Forces and Minister of Defense and Security.

Golkar
In addition to continuing his military career, Panggabean also began a political career by being involved in Golkar, the political party which Suharto had chosen as part of his re-election bid. In 1973, Panggabean became a member of the Golkar Executive Board before becoming Chairman of the Executive Board in 1974. He served in this position until 1978 when Suharto replaced him in the position. Nevertheless, Panggabean was retained as vice chairman of the executive board and served as the day-to-day chairman until 1988.

Government official
After being discharged as commander, Panggabean was named by Suharto as Coordinating Minister of Politics and Security. He served as Minister until 1983 when he was appointed Chairman of the Supreme Advisory Council. When his term ended in 1988, Panggabean retired from politics.

Other activities
In 1985, Panggabean became Advisory Chairman for the Joint Organization of Batak Tradition and Culture. In 1989, he became a Patron of the Bona Pasogit Foundation, an organization dealing with rehabilitation of earthquake affected areas in Panggabean's native Tarutung.

Death
Panggabean died in Jakarta on 22 May 2000 after suffering from a stroke.

Miscellaneous
Panggabean was married to Meida Seimima Tambunan with whom he had four children.

He was of Batak ethnicity and was a Protestant.

Honour

National honours
  Star of the Republic of Indonesia, 2nd Class (10 March 1973) 
  Star of Mahaputera, 2nd Class (17 July 1970) 
  Military Distinguished Service Star
  Guerrilla Star
  Star of Yudha Dharma, 1st Class
  Star of Kartika Eka Paksi, 1st Class
  Star of Jalasena, 1st Class
  Star of Swa Bhuwana Paksa, 1st Class
  Star of Bhayangkara, 1st Class
  Indonesian Armed Forces "8 Years" Service Star
  Military Long Service Medal, 24 Years Service
  1st Independence War Medal
  2nd Independence War Medal
  Military Operational Service Medal for Sulawesi 1958
  "Sapta Marga" Medal
  Military Service Medal for Irian Jaya 1962
  Northern Borneo Military Campaign Medal
  Medal for Combat Against Communists

Foreign honours
  :
  Honorary Grand Commander of the Order of Loyalty to the Crown of Malaysia (1971)

Notes

External links
 Profile on Tokohindonesia.com

|-

|-

|-

|-

1922 births
2000 deaths
Chiefs of Staff of the Indonesian Army
Commanders of the Indonesian National Armed Forces
Defense ministers of Indonesia
Honorary Grand Commanders of the Order of Loyalty to the Crown of Malaysia
Indonesian collaborators with Imperial Japan
Indonesian generals
Indonesian Lutherans
Indonesian Protestants
Members of Pembela Tanah Air
People from North Tapanuli Regency
People of Batak descent
People of the Indonesia–Malaysia confrontation